The 2013–14 Serie D was the sixty-sixth edition of the top level Italian non-professional football championship. It represented the fifth tier in the Italian football league system.

It consisted of 161 teams, after the exclusion of Nardò and including the retired Ragusa and Bojano. It was divided into eight 18-team divisions and a 17-team division.

Promotions
The nine division winners are automatically promoted to the new 2014–15 Serie C.

Playoffs
Teams placed second through fifth in each division enter a playoff tournament, after the regular season, where the nine winners will compete among themselves with the best semifinalist and the finalist of Coppa Italia Serie D to determine three of the four semi-finalists. The fourth is the winner of Coppa Italia Serie D. The winner could receive a professional licence in event of bankruptcy of a Serie C club.

Relegations
The two last-placed teams (17th and 18th) and the last (17th) in the Girone H, with the 16th if the 13th place is more of 8 points ahead of it and the 15th if the 14th place is more of 8 points ahead of this, are directly relegated. Otherwise the teams ranked 13th to 16th play a two-legged tie-breaker (13th vs 16th, and 14th vs 15th).

Scudetto Serie D
The nine division winners enter a tournament to determine the over-all Serie D champion and is awarded the Scudetto Serie D.

Events

Start of season
Given a normal season where there are no team failures and special promotions, Serie D would feature 9 teams that had been relegated from Seconda Divisione, 36 teams that had been promoted from Eccellenza, and 123 teams that had played in Serie D the year before.

Due to sixteen bankruptcies and exclusions, the 2013–14 season is to feature 5 teams that played in the 2012–13 Seconda Divisione season, 43 teams that played in the 2011–12 Eccellenza season and 115 teams that played in 2012–13 Serie D.

The league further admitted sixteen teams from Eccellenza to fill the vacancies created. These teams are:
 Mezzocorona, which finished 17th in Serie D 2012–13 Girone B
 Giorgione, which finished 17th in Serie D 2012–13 Girone C
 Pontevecchio, which finished 14th in Serie D 2012–13 Girone E
 R.C. Angolana, which finished 14th in Serie D 2012–13 Girone F
 Recanatese, which finished 16th in Serie D 2012–13 Girone F
 Budoni, which finished 13th in Serie D 2012–13 Girone G
 Anziolavinio, which finished 14th in Serie D 2012–13 Girone G
 Grottaglie, which finished 16th in Serie D 2012–13 Girone H
 Ripa La Fenadora, which finished 2nd in Eccellenza Veneto Girone B and was eliminated in the national play-off
 Triestina, which finished 2nd in Eccellenza Friuli-Venezia Giulia and was eliminated in the national play-off
 Correggese, which finished 2nd in Eccellenza Emilia-Romagna Girone A and was eliminated in the national play-off
 Sancolombano which finished 2nd in Eccellenza Lombardy Girone B and was eliminated in the national play-off
 Giulianova, which finished 2nd in Eccellenza Abruzzo and was eliminated in the national play-off
 Latte Dolce, which finished 2nd in Eccellenza Sardinia and was eliminated in the national play-off
 Rende, which finished 2nd in Eccellenza Calabria and was eliminated in the national play-off
 Due Torri, which finished 3rd in Eccellenza Sicily Girone B and was eliminated in the national play-off

Standings

Girone A

Teams 
Teams from Aosta Valley, Piedmont, Liguria and Lombardy

League table

Girone B

Teams 
Teams from Emilia-Romagna, Lombardy and Veneto.

League table

Girone C

Teams 
Teams from Friuli-Venezia Giulia, Trentino-Alto Adige/Südtirol and Veneto.

League table

Girone D

Teams 
Teams from Emilia-Romagna, Lombardy, Tuscany and Veneto.

League table

Girone E

Teams 
Teams from Lazio, Tuscany and Umbria.

League table

Girone F

Teams 
Teams from Abruzzo, Marche and Molise.

League table

Girone G

Teams 
Teams from Lazio and Sardinia.

League table

Girone H

Teams 
Teams from Apulia, Basilicata and Campania.

League table

Girone I

Teams 
Teams from Calabria, Campania and Sicily.

League table

Scudetto Dilettanti

First round
division winners placed into 3 groups of 3
group winners and best second-placed team qualify for semi-finals

Group 1

Group 2

Group 3

Semi-finals
Each game was played in one leg on 29 May 2014 on neutral grounds. They were extended to penalty kicks without playing extra time.

Final
One leg final was played on 31 May 2014 on neutral ground.

Scudetto Winner: Pordenone

Promotion play-off

Promotion playoffs involved a total of 33 teams; four from Serie D divisions A-B-H (teams placed from 2nd through to 5th) and three from divisions C-G and I (teams placed 2nd to 4th), with the best semifinalist, the finalist and the winner of Coppa Italia Serie D that are directly respectively admitted to the third, fourth round and the Semi-final.

Rules

First and second round 
 The first two rounds were one-legged matches played in the home field of the best-placed team.
 The games ending in ties were extended to extra time. The higher classified team was declared the winner if the game was still tied after extra time. Penalty kicks were not taken.
 Round one matched 2nd & 5th-placed teams and 3rd & 4th-placed teams within each division (A, B, H only); 2nd-placed teams got a bye to the second round, awaiting winner of 2nd team-4th team matches (for divisions C, D, F, G, I; 3rd team-5th team match for division E).
 The two winners from each division played each other in the second round.

Third and fourth round 
 The nine winners – one each from the nine Serie D divisions – were qualified with division E 3rd-placer Arezzo, as the best ranked semifinalist of Coppa Italia Serie D to the third round, that was played in one-legged match in the home field of the best-placed team. 
 The five winners were qualified with division B 6th-placer Pontisola, as finalist of Coppa Italia Serie D to the fourth round, that was played in one-legged match in the home field of the best-placed team.
 The games ending in ties were extended to penalty kicks without playing extra time.

Semifinals and final 
 The three 4th-round winners were qualified for the semifinal round, joining division I 11th-placer Pomigliano, as Coppa Italia Serie D winner.
 The semifinals and the final, with the respective winners, were in a one-legged hosted in a neutral ground.
 The games ending in ties were extended to penalty kicks without playing extra time.

Repechages 
 The tournament results provide a list, starting with the winner, by which vacancies could be filled in Serie C.
 If the winner is not admitted to this league it gets €30,000, while the replacement (the finalist) instead gets €15,000.

First round
Borgosesia-Caronnese match played on 10 May 2014; all others played on 11 May 2014
Single-legged matches played at best-placed club's home field: 2nd-placed team plays home 5th-placed team, 3rd-placed team plays home 4th placed team (divisions A-B-H only) 
Games ending in a tie are extended to extra time; if still tied, the higher-classified team wins

Second round
Played on 14 May 2014 
Single-legged matches played at best-placed club's home field
Games ending in a tie are extended to extra time; if still tied, the higher-classified team wins

Third round
Played on 18 May 2014 
Single-legged matches played at best-placed club's home field
Games ending in a tie are extended to penalty kicks without playing extra time
Arezzo qualified directly as the best ranked semifinalist of Coppa Italia Serie D

Fourth round
Played on 25 May 2014 
Single-legged matches played on best-placed club's home ground
Games ending in a tie are extended to penalty kicks without play extra time
Pontisola qualified directly as the finalist of Coppa Italia Serie D

Semifinals
Played on 1 June 2014 
On home team's ground
Games ending in a tie are extended to penalty kicks without playing extra time
Pomigliano qualified directly as the winner of Coppa Italia Serie D

Final
Played on 8 June 2014
On neutral ground at Stadio Flaminio, Rome

Relegation play-off
Played on 18 May 2014
Single-legged matches played on best-placed club's home ground
In case of tied score, extra time is played; if score is still level, best-placed team wins
Team highlighted in green is saved, other is relegated to Eccellenza

References

Serie D seasons
5